Hacıbey can refer to:

 Hacıbey, Çorum
 Turkish spelling of Khadjibey